Thada Somboon-uan (born 3 November 2000) is a Thai weightlifter. He won the silver medal in the men's 55 kg event at the 2021 World Weightlifting Championships held in Tashkent, Uzbekistan.

He also competed in the men's 55 kg event at the 2018 World Weightlifting Championships held in Ashgabat, Turkmenistan.

Achievements

References

External links 
 

Living people
2000 births
Place of birth missing (living people)
Thada Somboon-uan
World Weightlifting Championships medalists
Southeast Asian Games medalists in weightlifting
Thada Somboon-uan
Competitors at the 2021 Southeast Asian Games
Thada Somboon-uan